Carleton Corner is a community in the Canadian province of Nova Scotia, located in Annapolis County adjacent to Bridgetown. It is a designated place with a population of 99 in 2021. It is on Nova Scotia Route 201.

This village was the site of the Battle of Bloody Creek (1711) and the Battle of Bloody Creek (1757). The Morse cemetery is a private family cemetery created in 1790, and is now designated a provincial heritage property. It is surrounded by a vintage wrought iron fence, and the graves of descendants of New England Planters Abner and Anna Morse bear grave markers from the period 1793 to 1924.

Demographics 

References

Communities in Annapolis County, Nova Scotia
Designated places in Nova Scotia